The Katzrin ancient village and synagogue (also Qasrin and Kasrin, from the Arabic Qisrin) is an open-air museum located in the Golan Heights on the outskirts of the Israeli settlement of Katzrin. It features the partially reconstructed remains of a village from the 4th-8th century CE, that is: mainly from the Byzantine period, but starting from the Late Roman and extending into the Early Muslim era (Rashidun and Umayyad periods), or in Jewish terms from the Talmudic period.

History: archaeological site and park

The ancient Jewish farming village of Katzrin was built around a spring, which still flowed until recently. Above-ground ruins already existed at the site, and archaeological excavations have increased the number of accessible ancient buildings. An ancient synagogue was discovered in 1967 and excavated between 1971 and 1984. Other parts of the village were excavated beginning in 1983. Some of the buildings have been reconstructed on their ancient foundations and furnished with replicas of household goods and tools. An ancient wine press and olive press have also been made functional with new ropes and beams. Costumed guides demonstrate and explain in Hebrew and English construction methods, agricultural and manufacturing processes.

Synagogue

History
The Katzrin Synagogue was built in the 6th century CE atop a more modest, probably late-4th-century synagogue. Fragments of a mosaic floor have been found. The synagogue was apparently destroyed by the catastrophic 749 earthquake. In the Mamluk period, part of the standing ruin was roofed and used as a mosque. After a brief period, this use and the village itself were abandoned until 1967.

Description
The synagogue had two rows of four columns each. The building was two stories tall with rows of windows at the top of the walls. The roof was built of  wooden beams covered with ceramic tiles. In the southern wall, which faces  Jerusalem, two massive stone steps lead to a raised  stone platform (bimah). It is thought that a wooden Torah ark would have stood here. Under the bimah there is a long, stone-paved space thought to have served as a geniza (storage space for sacred texts no longer in use). The walls were plastered and painted white, with the lower walls decorated with red geometric motifs. The walls were lined with stone benches in the form of a double step.

The basalt lintel of one of the houses unearthed in the Golan bears a Hebrew inscription that reads: "This is the beit midrash of Rabbi Elazar the Caper Maker." This discovery ties in with a discussion in the Talmud that revolves around wearing new shoes on the Sabbath: What are new shoes? Shoes that have not “walked” a certain distance, in this case the distance between the synagogue at Katzrin and the beit midrash of Rabbi Elazar the Caper Maker.

See also
 Archaeology of Israel
 Oldest synagogues in the world

References

External links
Photos of the Katzrin Synagogue at the Manar al-Athar photo archive
Open-air museums
Classical sites on the Golan Heights
Synagogues preserved as museums
Mosques converted from synagogues
Archaeological museums
Tourist attractions in the Golan Heights
Former populated places on the Golan Heights
Synagogues in Syria
Ancient synagogues in the Land of Israel
Ancient Jewish settlements of the Golan Heights
8th-century disestablishments in the Umayyad Caliphate
Establishments in the Seleucid Empire
Outdoor structures in Syria